Habshan–Fujairah oil pipeline, also known as "Abu Dhabi Crude Oil Pipeline (ADCOP)", is an oil pipeline in the United Arab Emirates.  It starts from the Habshan onshore field in Abu Dhabi and runs to Fujairah on the Gulf of Oman.

History
The pipeline was ordered by the International Petroleum Investment Company in order to increase the security of supply and reduce oil transportation through the Strait of Hormuz.  The conceptual design of the pipeline was completed in 2006 by Tebodin, and the construction related contracts were awarded in 2007. EPC contract for the project was awarded to China Petroleum Engineering and Construction Corporation and China Petroleum Pipeline Bureau, both subsidiaries of the China National Petroleum Corporation. Construction of the pipeline started on 19 March 2008. It was completed in March 2011. However, its commissioning was postponed several times and it became operational in June 2012. The pipeline was inaugurated on 15 July 2012 when it made its first delivery of Murban crude to Pak-Arab Refinery.

Technical description
It passes east of Abu Dhabi city, through Sweihan and west of Al Ain. It cost $3.3 billion.

The pipeline is designated to supply the refinery in Fujairah as also the Fujairah export terminal.

Contractors
The conceptual design of the pipeline was done by Tebodin Consultants & Engineers, while front-end engineering design was delivered by WorleyParsons. Penspen delivered detailed design and engineering, as also project and construction management assistance. The environmental impact assessment was carried out by URS Corporation, the topographical survey by Maps Geosystems, and the geotechnical survey by Fugro Middle East and the Arab Centre for Engineering Studies. ILF Consulting Engineers were appointed as Project Management Consultants and EPC was carried out by China Petroleum Engineering and Construction Corporation.

Oil tanks at the Fujairah terminal were constructed by Italy's Belleli Energy. The mooring system was provided by Bluewater Energy Services. An integrated electrical system for the pipeline was designed and supplied by ABB. Siemens together with 3W Networks designed and undertook the complete engineering, procurement and construction of the integrated control and safety systems and telecom scope. Pipes were supplied by Sumitomo, Salzgitter AG and Jindal Saw. The technical assurance, risk and safety, asset management, and industrial inspection were done by Germanischer Lloyd. After commissioning Siemens is providing maintenance services for the automation, control and telecom systems.

References

2012 establishments in the United Arab Emirates
Oil pipelines in the United Arab Emirates
Economy of the Emirate of Abu Dhabi
Economy of the Emirate of Fujairah